Grane oil pipeline is a pipeline system in western Norway. The pipeline operations commenced with start of production in the Grane oil field.

Technical features
The greatest sea depth pipeline passes through is  - through the Norwegian Trench. Over 110,000 tonnes of rock and gravel was used on the seabed to establish the correct foundation for the pipeline.
The estimated lifetime of the pipeline is expected to be 30 years.

Ownership
The Grane pipeline is operated by Statoil and includes other partners.

Total investment at start-up was nearly 1.6 billion NOK's.

See also

Oseberg oil field
Grane oil field
Sture terminal
North Sea oil

References

External links
Norsk Hydro official site

Energy infrastructure completed in 2003
Oil pipelines in Norway
North Sea energy
Norsk Hydro
Equinor
2003 establishments in Norway